Gilbert Brunat (28 February 1958 – 16 November 2019)  was a French rugby union player who played wing and hooker.

Career
After his start at Union sportive in Iseaux, Brunat began playing for SO Chambéry. His talent was discovered and he was selected for the France national rugby union team.

After playing one season with FC Aix-les-Bains, Brunat began playing for FC Grenoble in 1986, where he lasted for seven years.

A French championship Title private following a refereeing error with Grenoble 1993
Despite overpowering pack called the Mammoths of Grenoble his club tilts on the score of 14-11.
A try of Olivier Brouzet is denied to Grenoble and the decisive try by Gary Whetton was awarded by the referee, Daniel Salles, when in fact the defender Franck Hueber from Grenoble touched down the ball first in his try zone.
This error gave the title to Castres. Salles admitted the error 13 years later.
Jacques Fouroux the coach of FC Grenoble in conflict with the Federation and who was already suspicious before the match of the referee cry out conspiracy.

He finished his playing career in 1996 with CS Bourgoin-Jallieu.

Brunat had two stints coaching US Montmélian and one with U.S. Vinay.

Gibert Brunat died on 16 November 2019.

Honours
 French premiership:
 Runners-up (1) : 1993 (FC Grenoble)
 Challenge Yves du Manoir:
 Champions (2) : 1981 (FC Lourdes), 1987 (FC Grenoble)
 Runners-up (1) : 1990 (FC Grenoble)
 Coupe de France:
 Runners-up (1) : 1984 (FC Lourdes)

References

1958 births
2019 deaths
French rugby union players
Rugby union hookers
Rugby union wings